Juan Alfonso Baptista Díaz (born 9 September 1976) is a Venezuelan-Colombian actor and model best known for his roles in Pasión de Gavilanes and La Mujer En El Espejo.

Biography
Juan Alfonso Baptista attended elementary school at Colegio Santo Tomás de Villanueva and his high school at Instituto Escuela Chaves.
His interest in acting came after soccer. He was a member of the Venezuelan National Selection of Soccer when he was 13 years of age (minor leagues).
In his acting career, he is best known for starring in telenovelas, including the worldwide success, Pasión de gavilanes.

He holds a bachelor's degree in odontology from Universidad Santa María and a degree in advertising from Instituto Nuevas Profesiones. He has worked as a photographer in New York for the Diane Von Fürstenberg fashion company. In 2007, he moved to L.A. and signed a contract with St. Steven.

Filmography

Film roles

Television roles

References

External links 
 

1976 births
Living people
People from Caracas
Venezuelan male telenovela actors
Venezuelan male models